CEMR may refer to:
Council of European Municipalities and Regions
Central Manitoba Railway